Keith Richards: Under the Influence is a 2015 documentary film directed by Morgan Neville portraying Keith Richards as a songwriter, guitarist and performer as he records his first solo album in two decades. The film received its world premiere at the 2015 Toronto International Film Festival and was subsequently released via Netflix.

Cast 
 Steve Jordan
 Keith Richards
 Waddy Wachtel
 Tom Waits

References

External links
 
 
 

2015 documentary films
2015 films
Netflix original documentary films
American documentary films
2010s English-language films
2010s American films